Sticteulima is a genus of very small ectoparasitic sea snails, marine gastropod mollusks or micromollusks in   the Eulimidae family.

Species
Species within the genera Sticteulima include:
 Sticteulima australiensis (Thiele, 1930)
 Sticteulima badia (Watson, 1897)
 Sticteulima cameroni Laseron, 1955
 Sticteulima constellata (Melvill, 1898)
 Sticteulima fuscopunctata (E. A. Smith, 1890)
 Sticteulima incidenta (Laseron, 1955)
 Sticteulima jeffreysiana (Brusina, 1869)
 Sticteulima kawamurai (Habe, 1961)
 Sticteulima lata Bouchet & Warén, 1986
 Sticteulima lentiginosa (A. Adams, 1861)
 Sticteulima piperata (Sowerby, 1901)
 Sticteulima piperita (Hedley, 1909)
 Sticteulima plenicolora Raines, 2003
 Sticteulima portensis (Laseron, 1955)
 Sticteulima richteri Engl, 1997
 Sticteulima spreta (A. Adams, 1864)
 Sticteulima wareni Engl, 1997
Taxa inquerenda:
 Sticteulima amamiensis (Habe, 1961)
 Sticteulima ariel (A. Adams, 1861) 
 Sticteulima interrupta (A. Adams, 1864) 
Species brought into synonymy
 Sticteulima kermadecensis (Oliver, 1915): synonym of Melanella kermadecensis W. R. B. Oliver, 1915

References

 Laseron C. F. (1955). Revision of the New South Wales Eulimoid shells. Australian Zoologist 12 (2): 83-101